Burnett J. Bergeson (March 25, 1915 – February 2, 2011) was an American farmer and politician.

Biography
Bergeson was born in Canby, Minnesota. He went to the Northwestern School of Agriculture at University of Minnesota Crookston. He lived in Twin Valley, Minnesota with his wife and family and was a farmer. Bergeson also worked for the United States Department of Agriculture as a dairy specialist and as a supervisor. Bergeson served for four terms in the Minnesota House of Representatives from 1955 to 1962 and was a Democrat. He retired and moved to Reno, Nevada. He died at his home in Reno, Nevada.

Notes

External links

Burnett J. Bergeson: An Inventory of His Legislative Papers at the Minnesota Historical Society

1915 births
2011 deaths
People from Norman County, Minnesota
People from Yellow Medicine County, Minnesota
Politicians from Reno, Nevada
University of Minnesota Crookston alumni
Farmers from Minnesota
United States Department of Agriculture people
Democratic Party members of the Minnesota House of Representatives